Taleomy Indian Reserve No. 3, officially Taleomy 3, is an Indian reserve under the governance of the Nuxalk Nation, located at the mouth of the Taleomey River on the east shore of South Bentinck Arm in the Central Coast region of British Columbia, Canada.

See also
Tallheo Hot Springs
List of Indian reserves in British Columbia

References

Nuxalk
Indian reserves in British Columbia
Central Coast of British Columbia